Professor John Ning-Yuean Lee, KHS (李寧遠; Hanyu pinyin: Li Ningyuan; 2 September 1945–) is a Taiwanese biologist and former president of Fu Jen Catholic University. At present, he is the chair professor of Beijing Normal University Zhuhai campus.

He obtained the bachelor's, master's and doctoral degree at National Taiwan University. Afterward, he served as professor at the National Taiwan Sport University, the 1st dean of College of Human Ecology and university president at Fu Jen, dean of College of Living Technology at Tainan University of Technology.

Honor
 Order of the Holy Sepulchre

References

External links
 輔大校史室：李寧遠

1945 births
Academic staff of Fu Jen Catholic University
National Taiwan University alumni
Presidents of universities and colleges in Taiwan
Taiwanese educators
Living people